Canara can refer to:

 Canara or Kanara, a region in the state of Karnataka, India
 Canara, former name of Ovidiu, a town in Constanţa County, Romania
 Canara Bank
 Canara Engineering College, a private engineering college in Karnataka, India
 Canara College, Mangalore, India
 Canara High School, Mangalore, India